Hydrelia rhodoptera is a moth in the family Geometridae first described by George Hampson in 1895. It is found in China and Sikkim, India.

References

Moths described in 1895
Asthenini
Moths of Asia